A list of American films released in 1976.

Rocky won the Academy Award for Best Picture.
Rocky was also the highest-grossing American film released during 1976.



A-B

C-G

H-L

M-R

S-Z

Documentaries

See also
 1976 in American television
 1976 in the United States

References

External links

1976 films at the Internet Movie Database
List of 1976 box office number-one films in the United States

1976
Films
Lists of 1976 films by country or language